Piz Neir is a mountain of the Albula Alps, overlooking Bivio in the canton of Graubünden. It lies on the group south of Piz d'Agnel.

References

External links
 Piz Neir on Hikr

Mountains of the Alps
Mountains of Graubünden
Mountains of Switzerland